From March 7 to June 6, 1972, voters of the Republican Party chose its nominee for president in the 1972 United States presidential election. Incumbent President Richard Nixon was again selected as the nominee through a series of primary elections and caucuses culminating in the 1972 Republican National Convention held from August 21 to August 23, 1972, in Miami, Florida.

Candidates

Nominee

Withdrew during primaries

Polling

National polling

Overview of the race 
Nixon was a popular incumbent president in 1972, as he seemed to have reached détente with China and the USSR. He shrugged off the first glimmers of what, after the election, became the massive Watergate scandal.

Polls showed that Nixon had a strong lead. He was challenged by two minor candidates, liberal Pete McCloskey of California and conservative John Ashbrook of Ohio. McCloskey ran as an anti-Vietnam war candidate dedicated to a much more clearer liberal position compared to Nixon's ambiguity approach within the party, while Ashbrook was dedicated to a much more clearer conservative position than Nixon and opposed Nixon's détente policies towards China and the Soviet Union. In the New Hampshire primary McCloskey's platform of peace garnered 19.7% of the vote to Nixon's 67.9%, with Ashbrook receiving 10.9% and comedian Pat Paulsen receiving 1.1%. Having previously stated that he would withdraw from the race had he not achieved 20% of the vote, McCloskey did so.

Nixon won 1,347 of the 1,348 delegates to the GOP convention, with McCloskey receiving the vote of one delegate from New Mexico.

Timeline of the race

March 7

March 14

March 21

April 4

April 25

May 2

May 4

May 6

May 9

May 16

May 23

June 6

Results by popular vote

See also 
 1972 Democratic Party presidential primaries

References